In mathematics, the isoperimetric inequality is a geometric inequality involving the perimeter of a set and its volume. In -dimensional space  the inequality lower bounds the surface area or perimeter  of a set  by its volume ,

,

where  is a unit sphere.

On a plane, i.e. when , the isoperimetric inequality relates the square of the circumference of a closed curve and the area of a plane region it encloses. Isoperimetric literally means "having the same perimeter".

and that equality holds if and only if the curve is a circle.

The isoperimetric problem is to determine a plane figure of the largest possible area whose boundary has a specified length. The closely related Dido's problem asks for a region of the maximal area bounded by a straight line and a curvilinear arc whose endpoints belong to that line. It is named after Dido, the legendary founder and first queen of Carthage. The solution to the isoperimetric problem is given by a circle and was known already in Ancient Greece. However, the first mathematically rigorous proof of this fact was obtained only in the 19th century. Since then, many other proofs have been found.

The isoperimetric problem has been extended in multiple ways, for example, to curves on surfaces and to regions in higher-dimensional spaces. Perhaps the most familiar physical manifestation of the 3-dimensional isoperimetric inequality is the shape of a drop of water. Namely, a drop will typically assume a symmetric round shape. Since the amount of water in a drop is fixed, surface tension forces the drop into a shape which minimizes the surface area of the drop, namely a round sphere.

The isoperimetric problem in the plane 

The classical isoperimetric problem dates back to antiquity. The problem can be stated as follows: Among all closed curves in the plane of fixed perimeter, which curve (if any) maximizes the area of its enclosed region? This question can be shown to be equivalent to the following problem: Among all closed curves in the plane enclosing a fixed area, which curve (if any) minimizes the perimeter?

This problem is conceptually related to the principle of least action in physics, in that it can be restated: what is the principle of action which encloses the greatest area, with the greatest economy of effort? The 15th-century philosopher and scientist, Cardinal Nicholas of Cusa, considered rotational action, the process by which a circle is generated, to be the most direct reflection, in the realm of sensory impressions, of the process by which the universe is created. German astronomer and astrologer Johannes Kepler invoked the isoperimetric principle in discussing the morphology of the solar system, in Mysterium Cosmographicum (The Sacred Mystery of the Cosmos, 1596).

Although the circle appears to be an obvious solution to the problem, proving this fact is rather difficult. The first progress toward the solution was made by Swiss geometer Jakob Steiner in 1838, using a geometric method later named Steiner symmetrisation. Steiner showed that if a solution existed, then it must be the circle. Steiner's proof was completed later by several other mathematicians.

Steiner begins with some geometric constructions which are easily understood; for example, it can be shown that any closed curve enclosing a region that is not fully convex can be modified to enclose more area, by "flipping" the concave areas so that they become convex. It can further be shown that any closed curve which is not fully symmetrical can be "tilted" so that it encloses more area. The one shape that is perfectly convex and symmetrical is the circle, although this, in itself, does not represent a rigorous proof of the isoperimetric theorem (see external links).

On a plane 
The solution to the isoperimetric problem is usually expressed in the form of an inequality that relates the length L of a closed curve and the area A of the planar region that it encloses. The isoperimetric inequality states that

and that the equality holds if and only if the curve is a circle. The area of a disk of radius R is πR2 and the circumference of the circle is 2πR, so both sides of the inequality are equal to 4π2R2 in this case.

Dozens of proofs of the isoperimetric inequality have been found. In 1902, Hurwitz published a short proof using the Fourier series that applies to arbitrary rectifiable curves (not assumed to be smooth). An elegant direct proof based on comparison of a smooth simple closed curve with an appropriate circle was given by E. Schmidt in 1938. It uses only the arc length formula, expression for the area of a plane region from Green's theorem, and the Cauchy–Schwarz inequality.

For a given closed curve, the isoperimetric quotient is defined as the ratio of its area and that of the circle having the same perimeter. This is equal to

and the isoperimetric inequality says that Q ≤ 1. Equivalently, the isoperimetric ratio  is at least 4 for every curve.

The isoperimetric quotient of a regular n-gon is

Let  be a smooth regular convex closed curve. Then the improved isoperimetric inequality states the following

On a sphere 

Let C be a simple closed curve on a sphere of radius 1. Denote by L the length of C and by A the area enclosed by C. The spherical isoperimetric inequality states that

and that the equality holds if and only if the curve is a circle. There are, in fact, two ways to measure the spherical area enclosed by a simple closed curve, but the inequality is symmetric with the respect to taking the complement.

This inequality was discovered by Paul Lévy (1919) who also extended it to higher dimensions and general surfaces.

In the more general case of arbitrary radius R, it is known  that

In  
The isoperimetric inequality states that a sphere has the smallest surface area per given volume. Given a bounded set  with surface area  and volume , the isoperimetric inequality states

where  is a unit ball. Under additional restrictions on the set (such as convexity, regularity, smooth boundary), the equality holds for a ball only. But in full generality the situation is more complicated. An extremal set consists of a ball and a "corona" that contributes neither to the volume nor to the surface area. That is, the equality holds for a compact set  if and only if  contains a closed ball  such that  and  For example, the "corona" may be a curve.

The proof of the inequality follows directly from Brunn–Minkowski inequality between a set  and a ball with radius , i.e. .

In full generality , the isoperimetric inequality states that for any set  whose closure has finite Lebesgue measure

If the boundary of S is rectifiable, then the Minkowski content is the (n-1)-dimensional Hausdorff measure.

for all .

In Hadamard manifolds 

Hadamard manifolds are complete simply connected manifolds with nonpositive curvature. Thus they generalize the Euclidean space , which is a Hadamard manifold with curvature zero. In 1970's and early 80's, Thierry Aubin, Misha Gromov, Yuri Burago, and Viktor Zalgaller conjectured that the Euclidean isoperimetric inequality

holds for bounded sets  in Hadamard manifolds, which has become known as the Cartan–Hadamard conjecture.
In dimension 2 this had already been established in 1926 by André Weil, who was a student of Hadamard at the time.
In dimensions 3 and 4 the conjecture was proved by Bruce Kleiner in 1992, and Chris Croke in 1984 respectively.

In a metric measure space

Most of the work on isoperimetric problem has been done in the context of smooth regions in Euclidean spaces, or more generally, in Riemannian manifolds. However, the isoperimetric problem can be formulated in much greater generality, using the notion of Minkowski content. Let  be a metric measure space: X is a metric space with metric d, and μ is a Borel measure on X. The boundary measure, or Minkowski content, of a measurable subset A of X is defined as the lim inf

 

where

 

is the ε-extension of A.

The isoperimetric problem in X asks how small can  be for a given μ(A). If X is the Euclidean plane with the usual distance and the Lebesgue measure then this question generalizes the classical isoperimetric problem to planar regions whose boundary is not necessarily smooth, although the answer turns out to be the same.

The function

is called the isoperimetric profile of the metric measure space . Isoperimetric profiles have been studied for Cayley graphs of discrete groups and for special classes of Riemannian manifolds (where usually only regions A with regular boundary are considered).

For graphs 

In graph theory, isoperimetric inequalities are at the heart of the study of expander graphs, which are sparse graphs that have strong connectivity properties. Expander constructions have spawned research in pure and applied mathematics, with several applications to complexity theory, design of robust computer networks, and the theory of error-correcting codes.

Isoperimetric inequalities for graphs relate the size of vertex subsets to the size of their boundary, which is usually measured by the number of edges leaving the subset (edge expansion) or by the number of neighbouring vertices (vertex expansion). For a graph  and a number , the following are two standard isoperimetric parameters for graphs.

The edge isoperimetric parameter: 
The vertex isoperimetric parameter: 

The isoperimetric problem consists of understanding how the parameters  and  behave for natural families of graphs.

Example: Isoperimetric inequalities for hypercubes 
The -dimensional hypercube  is the graph whose vertices are all Boolean vectors of length , that is, the set . Two such vectors are connected by an edge in  if they are equal up to a single bit flip, that is, their Hamming distance is exactly one.
The following are the isoperimetric inequalities for the Boolean hypercube.

Edge isoperimetric inequality 

Vertex isoperimetric inequality 
Harper's theorem says that Hamming balls have the smallest vertex boundary among all sets of a given size. This theorem implies that any set  with

satisfies

As a special case, consider set sizes  of the form

for some integer . Then the above implies that the exact vertex isoperimetric parameter is

Isoperimetric inequality for triangles

The isoperimetric inequality for triangles in terms of perimeter p and area T states that

with equality for the equilateral triangle. This is implied, via the AM–GM inequality, by a stronger inequality which has also been called the isoperimetric inequality for triangles:

See also

 Blaschke–Lebesgue theorem
 Chaplygin problem
 Curve-shortening flow
 Expander graph
 Gaussian isoperimetric inequality
 Isoperimetric dimension
 Isoperimetric point
 List of triangle inequalities
 Planar separator theorem
 Mixed volume

Notes

References 

Blaschke and Leichtweiß, Elementare Differentialgeometrie (in German), 5th edition, completely revised by K. Leichtweiß. Die Grundlehren der mathematischen Wissenschaften, Band 1. Springer-Verlag, New York Heidelberg Berlin, 1973 

.
Gromov, M.: "Paul Levy's isoperimetric inequality". Appendix C in Metric structures for Riemannian and non-Riemannian spaces. Based on the 1981 French original. With appendices by M. Katz, P. Pansu and S. Semmes. Translated from the French by Sean Michael Bates. Progress in Mathematics, 152. Birkhäuser Boston, Inc., Boston, Massachusetts, 1999.
.

.

.
.

External links

 History of the Isoperimetric Problem at Convergence
 Treiberg: Several proofs of the isoperimetric inequality
 Isoperimetric Theorem at cut-the-knot

Analytic geometry
Calculus of variations
Geometric inequalities
Multivariable calculus
Theorems in measure theory